This is a list of members of the Victorian Legislative Council from the elections of 17 August – 16 September 1878 to the elections of 20 March – 14 July 1880.

There were six Electoral Provinces and five members elected to each Province.

Note the "Term in Office" refers to that members term(s) in the Council, not necessarily for that Province.

William Mitchell was President of the Council, Caleb Jenner was Chairman of Committees.

 Cole died 26 April 1879, replaced by James Lorimer who was elected unopposed 12 May 1879 sworn-in in July 1879.

References

 Re-member (a database of all Victorian MPs since 1851). Parliament of Victoria.

Members of the Parliament of Victoria by term
19th-century Australian politicians